Khadijetou El Mokhtar is a politician for the disputed Sahrawi Arab Democratic Republic who is the territory's special representative to Peru.

Khadijetou El Mokhtar is President of the Union of Sahrawi Women.  She was appointed special representative of the Sahrawi Arab Democratic Republic (SADR) diplomatic corps to Peru by president Brahim Ghali on 15 May 2017.  El Mokhtar was also described as the SADR's "Roving Ambassador to Latin America".  Peru had originally recognised the SADR as a state in 1984 but rescinded that recognition and froze diplomatic ties in 1996.

President Ghali requested that El Mokhtar travel to Peru to begin negotiations to restore diplomatic relations, that he had agreed to in May 2016.  It was also claimed that she travelled at the invitation of the Peruvian senate.  El Mokhtar entered Peru on a Spanish passport and a tourist visa as her SADR documentation was not recognised by the country.  She was involved in political meetings between 10 June and 18 July but on re-entering Peru on 9 September was refused entry and detained at Lima International Airport.  She had been added to a list of people banned from entering Peru, as her political meetings had breached the terms of her tourist visa.  She remained at the airport, unable to enter the country and unwilling to leave despite calls for her release.  El Mokhtar refused to leave willingly for the SADR and was, on 28 September, placed on a flight to Spain against her will.

References 

Living people
Sahrawi women's rights activists
Sahrawi diplomats
Sahrawi women diplomats
Year of birth missing (living people)
Ambassadors to Peru
Place of birth missing (living people)
Women ambassadors